Tubificoides is a genus of annelids belonging to the family Naididae.

The genus was described in 1937 by Lastočkin.

Species:
 Tubificoides aculeatus (Cook, 1969)
 Tubificoides aguadillensis Milligan, 1987
 Tubificoides amplivasatus (Erséus, 1975)
 Tubificoides annulus Erséus, 1986
 Tubificoides apectinatus Brinkhurst, 1965
 Tubificoides bakeri Brinkhurst, 1985
 Tubificoides benedii (Udekem, 1855)
 Tubificoides heterochaetus
 Tubificoides pseudogaster

References

Enchytraeidae